St. Nicholas Chapel is a historic Russian Orthodox chapel in Sand Point, Alaska. Now it is under Diocese of Alaska of the Orthodox Church in America

It was built in 1936.  According to a 1979 evaluation of the church for possible historic registry listing, it is "a building of strong religious statement, clear and expressive."   The evaluation notes that its entrance vestibule is within a "commanding" square tower at its west end, which "rises to a truncated pyramidal roof above its second level, and supports a handsome open-work octagonal bell tower".

As of 1979, it was in deteriorated condition and services were no longer conducted in the building (they were conducted in a private house, instead).  But the building was "swept and kept neat" and secure from vandalism.

It was added to the National Register of Historic Places in 1980.

See also
National Register of Historic Places listings in Aleutians East Borough, Alaska

References

External links

 

1936 establishments in Alaska
Historic American Buildings Survey in Alaska
Buildings and structures on the National Register of Historic Places in Aleutians East Borough, Alaska
Churches on the National Register of Historic Places in Alaska
Churches completed in 1936
Russian Orthodox church buildings in Alaska
Russian Orthodox chapels